Belgium was represented by Laura Omloop in the Junior Eurovision Song Contest 2009 with the song "Zo verliefd (Yodelo)".

Before Eurovision

Junior Eurosong 2009 
Belgium selected their Junior Eurovision Song Contest entry for 2009 through Junior Eurosong, a national selection consisting of 12 songs. 

Before the final, three semi-finals were held with four songs each. In each semi-final, four of the competing artists competed, performing abridged versions of their songs in two different versions, with televoting selecting the top two to qualify for the final. In the final, the winner was selected once again by televoting. A jury panel consisting of Kathleen Aerts and Walter Grootaers took part in all shows, but solely in an advisory role.

Competing entries 
Around 500 songs were received by VRT for the contest, with only 12 (eleven in Dutch and one in French) being chosen to compete in the national final.

Semi-final 1
The first semi-final took place on 5 September 2009. Four of the competing artists performed two versions of their songs, with televoting selecting the top two to qualify for the final.

Semi-final 2
The second semi-final took place on 12 September 2009. Four of the competing artists performed two versions of their songs, with televoting selecting the top two to qualify for the final.

Semi-final 3
The third semi-final took place on 19 September 2009. Four of the competing artists performed two versions of their songs, with televoting selecting the top two to qualify for the final.

Final
The final took place on 19 September 2009, where the six qualifiers from the preceding semi-finals competed. The winner was selected by televoting. Only the top two songs were announced.

At Junior Eurovision

Voting

Notes

References

External links
 Belgium's page at JuniorEurovision.tv

Junior Eurovision Song Contest
Belgium
2009